Iurii Utkin (born 3 August 1990) is a Ukrainian visually impaired cross-country skier and  biathlete. He  represented Ukraine at the Paralympics in 2010, 2014 and 2018.

Career 
Iurii made his Paralympic debut during the 2010 Winter Paralympics and went medalless at the event. He clinched his first Paralympic medal, a silver medal in the 4 x 2.5 km relay open event at the 2014 Winter Paralympics.

 Paralympic Champion (Korea 2018)
He also claimed a bronze medal in the men's 12.5km visually impaired biathlon event as a part of the 2018 Winter Paralympics with the assistance of his sighted guide, Ruslan Perekhoda.

References 

1990 births
Living people
Ukrainian male cross-country skiers
Ukrainian male biathletes
Cross-country skiers at the 2010 Winter Paralympics
Cross-country skiers at the 2014 Winter Paralympics
Cross-country skiers at the 2018 Winter Paralympics
Biathletes at the 2010 Winter Paralympics
Biathletes at the 2014 Winter Paralympics
Biathletes at the 2018 Winter Paralympics
Paralympic cross-country skiers of Ukraine
Paralympic biathletes of Ukraine
Paralympic silver medalists for Ukraine
Paralympic bronze medalists for Ukraine
Medalists at the 2014 Winter Paralympics
Medalists at the 2018 Winter Paralympics
Ukrainian blind people
Visually impaired category Paralympic competitors
Sportspeople from Kharkiv
Paralympic medalists in cross-country skiing
Paralympic medalists in biathlon